Cyril Dumoulin (born 2 February 1984) is a French handball player for HBC Nantes and the French national team.

He participated at the 2019 World Men's Handball Championship.

References

1984 births
Living people
French male handball players
People from Rillieux-la-Pape
Sportspeople from Lyon Metropolis
Competitors at the 2009 Mediterranean Games
Mediterranean Games silver medalists for France
Mediterranean Games medalists in handball